Burren National Park is one of six national parks in Ireland, managed by the National Parks and Wildlife Service. It covers a small part of the Burren, a karst landscape in County Clare on the west coast.

Burren National Park was founded and opened to the public in 1991. It features 1,500 hectares of mountains, bogs, heaths, grasslands and forests. The park is the smallest of Ireland's national parks.

See also 
 Burren and Cliffs of Moher Geopark

References

External links 
 Burren National Park Website

National parks of the Republic of Ireland
Geography of County Clare
Protected areas established in 1991
1991 establishments in Ireland
Parks in County Clare